Love and Obsession (korean: 장화홍련) It is a South Korean television series that aired on KBS2 from October 20, 2009 to April 23, 2010.

Cast 

 Yoon Hae-young as Hong-ryeon
 Kim Se-ah as  Yoon Jang-hwa
 Jang Hyun-sung as Kang Tae-yun

Ratings 
The drama scored 23%, which is the highest number recorded during its broadcast until its end.

References

External links 
 

2009 South Korean television series debuts
2010 South Korean television series endings
Korean Broadcasting System television dramas